Zahalka is a European surname of Slavic origin. Notable people with the surname include:

Anne Zahalka (born 1957), Australian photographer
Jamal Zahalka (born 1955), Palestinian-Israeli politician
Milan Zahálka (born 1977), Czech footballer
Matej Zahálka (born 1993), Czech cyclist